Ilen may refer to:

 River Ilen, County Cork, Ireland
 Ilen Rovers GAA, a Gaelic football club in County Cork, Ireland
 Ilen School and Network for Wooden Boat Building, a charity in Limerick, Ireland
 A. K. Ilen (Auxiliary Ketch Ilen), an Irish ship
 Embet Ilen (c. 1801–1851), Eritrean politician
 Ilen Church, a church in Trondheim, Norway